Kelibia Fort is a citadel built in the sixteenth century, situated on a rocky promontory 150 meters high overlooking the Mediterranean Sea and the city of Kélibia in the Governorate of Nabeul, on the northeast coast of the Tunisian peninsula of Cap Bon.

References

Forts in Tunisia
16th-century fortifications